Lukas Flüeler (born October 22, 1988) is a Swiss former professional ice hockey Goaltender who played the entirety of top flight professional career with ZSC Lions of the National League (NL). Flüeler competed in the 2012 IIHF World Championship as a member of the Switzerland men's national ice hockey team.

References

External links

1988 births
Living people
GCK Lions players
Ottawa 67's players
Swiss ice hockey goaltenders
ZSC Lions players